Charles French may refer to:

 C. G. W. French (1822–1891), American jurist and judge, full name Charles Grafton Wilberton French
 Charles French (entomologist) (1842–1933), Australian horticulturalist and naturalist
 Charles French (politician) (1851–1925), Irish politician
 Charles K. French (1860–1952), American film actor
 Charles M. French (1876–?), American athlete
 Charlie French (1883–1962), U.S. baseball player
 Charles Daniel French (1884–1954), Canadian politician and Member of the Legislative Assembly of Quebec
 Charles Jackson French (1919–1956), American sailor